Lingelsheimia sylvestris is a species of plant in the family Phyllanthaceae. It is endemic to Tanzania. It is confined to a forest reserve surrounded by intense development.

References

Phyllanthaceae
Endemic flora of Tanzania
Critically endangered flora of Africa
Taxonomy articles created by Polbot